Light rail in New Jersey is provided by NJ Transit, a state-owned corporation which also provides bus and commuter rail services. Light rail, among other forms of transit, is a major part of the state's Smart Growth policy.

Hudson–Bergen Light Rail 

The Hudson–Bergen Light Rail (HBLR) is a service that connects the Hudson County communities of Bayonne, Jersey City, Hoboken, Weehawken, Union City, and North Bergen with 23 stops along 3 services.

This line was borne out of a public-private partnership in the mid-1990s, with Washington Group International, doing business as 21st Century Rail, chosen for a DBOM contract for the line to design, build, operate, and maintain the line for its first 15 years. With construction beginning in 1997, the first segments, from Exchange Place to West Side Avenue and 34th Street opening in 2000, with service to Pavonia-Newport, Hoboken Terminal, 22nd Street, Lincoln Harbor, and Tonnelle Avenue opening in later segments between 2000 and 2005, and 8th Street opening in 2011.

The current HBLR fleet consists of 53 low-floor electric light rail cars.

As of October 1, 2015, the current one-way fare on the HBLR is $2.25. The line works under a proof-of-payment system, requiring all riders to have a validated ticket (validated prior to boarding the train), transfer, or a valid pass.

Newark Light Rail 

The Newark Light Rail (NLR) is a light rail system composed of two sections, the Newark City Subway, originally opened in the 1930s by PSCT as the No. 7 line, and the sole surviving line of several that ran into this tunnel, and the Broad Street Line which operates from Newark Penn to Newark Broad Street via Washington Park and Riverfront Stadium, which opened in 2006. This line is also included in NJT Bus' Central Division, dating back to its days as a streetcar line.

Originally constructed as a streetcar line using PCC streetcars, the Newark City Subway ran from Newark Penn to a loop at the Newark city line located at what was then called Franklin Avenue. With the conversion of operation from PCC streetcars to cars similar to what is used on the HBLR, the Franklin Avenue loop was removed and replaced by Branch Brook Park, with service extended to Grove Street.

NLR utilizes a fleet of 20 cars, similar to the HBLR fleet.

As of October 1, 2015, NLR one-way fares are equivalent to a one-zone bus ride of $1.60, with the ability to purchase through tickets valid for a ride on Newark Light Rail and on a connecting bus to Bloomfield, Passaic and points beyond up to 4 local bus fare zones (generally, to Paterson, Willowbrook, and West Caldwell). The line works under a proof-of-payment system, requiring all riders to have a validated ticket (validated prior to boarding the train), transfer, bus through-ticket, or a valid pass.

River Line 

The River Line is a diesel tram-train light rail line operating from Trenton to Entertainment Center in Camden, with the line, except at the ends, running along the former Bordentown Secondary of Conrail, servicing 30 stops along the 34-mile route in the Route 130 corridor. This line is operated under contract to New Jersey Transit by Southern New Jersey Rail Group, a Bombardier/Bechtel joint-venture.

As of October 1, 2015, River Line fares are equivalent to a one-zone bus ride of $1.60. The line works under a proof-of-payment system, requiring all riders to have a validated ticket (validated prior to boarding the train), transfer, bus through-ticket, or a valid pass.

Planned projects 
New Jersey Transit is planning to extend the Hudson-Bergen Light Rail past its current terminus at Tonnelle Avenue to Englewood along the Northern Branch, an existing freight rail line. It has reached the final environmental impact statement stage, but its construction funding is not in place.

The Delaware River Port Authority is planning to build the Glassboro-Camden Line, a diesel light rail from the Walter Rand Transportation Center in Camden to Rowan University in Glassboro, along an existing freight rail line. Governor Jon Corzine formally endorsed the light rail, which will cost an estimated $1.3 billion, and New Jersey has committed $500 million in funding.

In 2017 NJT released made a request for proposal for Passaic-Bergen Rail Line to examine current conditions on the line and needs of communities it would serve.

Canceled projects 
The Newark-Elizabeth Rail Link and the Union County Light Rail have not advanced and been removed from NJT list of capital projects.

See also 
 Light rail in the United States
 List of United States light rail systems by ridership
 Light rail in North America

References

External links 

 New Jersey Transit – Light Rail (official website)

 
NJ Transit
NJ Transit Rail Operations